The 2000 Badminton Asia Championships was the 19th tournament of the Badminton Asia Championships. It was held in Jakarta, Indonesia.

Medalists

Medal table

Finals

Semifinals

External links
http://www.tournamentsoftware.com/sport/tournament.aspx?id=C9426976-D6C9-4C0E-8089-E4CE4BC6E010

Badminton Asia Championships
Asian Badminton Championships
2000 Badminton Asia Championships
Badminton Asia Championships
Badminton Asia Championships